Climbing bedstraw is a common name for several plants and may refer to:

 Galium nuttallii, native from Oregon to Baja California
 Galium porrigens, native from Santa Barbara County, California to Baja California